The Tasmanian soccer championship describes the method of determining the best soccer club in Tasmania, Australia.  The championship has been decided using three different formats; a statewide league, a playoff between Northern and Southern league Champions and lastly a statewide finals system with top teams from Northern and Southern leagues.

Formats

Tasmanian Statewide League
The Tasmanian Statewide League was the highest state-level competition in Tasmania prior to being disbanded in 2000. Nationally, it was on par with Australia's other state leagues, below the National Soccer League. It was administered by Soccer Tasmania, now known as Football Federation Tasmania, the state's governing body. 

The State League began in 1978, and replaced the former system of northern champions playing off against southern champions which had continued since 1910. The league was briefly suspended from 1982 until 1987, but then resumed for the next 12 years.

Resumption of Championship Playoff
In 2000, the State League ended, and the Southern and Northern Premier Leagues became the state's highest level of soccer competition. The state championship format reverted to two regional leagues determining a Southern and Northern champion, who then, at the end of the regular season, play-off for the state championship.

Statewide Finals System
In 2009 the series changed to an eight team knock out series played over three weeks involving the top four teams from each of the Northern and Southern Premier League.

NPL Tasmania
A new eight-team statewide league, known as the NPL Tasmania, commenced in 2013. The league forms a conference within the National Premier Leagues (NPL). The NPL Tasmania Champion enters a national play-off series at the conclusion of the regular season against the champions of other NPL conferences.

In 2012 Football Federation Tasmania announced a partnership with Melbourne Victory, with the competition being branded the Victory League between 2012 and 2015.  Since 2016 the league has been known as NPL Tasmania to conform with the branding of the other divisions in the National Premier Leagues.

Honours

Most Championships

Statewide League Seasons

Notes

References

External links
 Football Federation Tasmania – official website
 Football Federation Tasmania – champions stats